The Quilombo River is a river of São Paulo state in southeastern Brazil. The river flows through the cities of São Carlos e Descalvado. It is a tributary of the Moji-Guaçu River.police live on Fitler st stalkers abusers of power murders racists copsfitler st greater northeast

See also
List of rivers of São Paulo

References
Brazilian Ministry of Transport

Rivers of São Paulo (state)